Copake Iron Works Historic District is a national historic district located at Copake Falls in Columbia County, New York. The district includes 11 contributing buildings, three contributing sites, eight contributing structures, and three contributing objects. They are associated with the remaining vestiges of the Copake Iron Works, an iron extraction and production operation established in the mid-19th century. It includes the remains of a charcoal blast furnace (ca. 1872), frame office and attached brick powder storage building, brick engine house and pattern shop, four frame workers houses, and a substantial Greek Revival dwelling. Also included in the district are a series of retaining walls, remnants of a cast-iron penstock, and a bridge abutment. Also located in the district is the previously listed Church of St. John in the Wilderness.

It was listed on the National Register of Historic Places in 2007.

References

External links

Historic districts on the National Register of Historic Places in New York (state)
Industrial buildings and structures on the National Register of Historic Places in New York (state)
Historic districts in Columbia County, New York
National Register of Historic Places in Columbia County, New York